The 1937 Pittsburgh Pirates season was the 56th season of the Pittsburgh Pirates franchise; the 51st in the National League. The Pirates finished third in the league standings with a record of 86–68.

Offseason
 December 4, 1936: Ralph Birkofer and Cookie Lavagetto were traded by the Pirates to the Brooklyn Dodgers for Ed Brandt.

Regular season

Season standings

Record vs. opponents

Game log

|- bgcolor="ccffcc"
| 1 || April 20 || @ Cubs || 5–0 || Blanton (1–0) || French || — || 18,940 || 1–0
|- bgcolor="ccffcc"
| 2 || April 22 || @ Cubs || 4–2 || Brandt (1–0) || Lee || — || 4,078 || 2–0
|- bgcolor="ccffcc"
| 3 || April 23 || Reds || 4–3 || Hoyt (1–0) || Grissom || — || 22,000 || 3–0
|- bgcolor="ccffcc"
| 4 || April 24 || Reds || 3–2 || Swift (1–0) || Hallahan || — || 13,000 || 4–0
|- bgcolor="ffbbbb"
| 5 || April 27 || @ Cardinals || 1–3 || Weiland || Blanton (1–1) || — || 2,461 || 4–1
|- bgcolor="ccffcc"
| 6 || April 29 || Cubs || 6–5 (13) || Bowman (1–0) || Lee || — || 7,500 || 5–1
|- bgcolor="ffbbbb"
| 7 || April 30 || Cubs || 2–7 || Parmelee || Bauers (0–1) || — || 8,300 || 5–2
|-

|- bgcolor="ccffcc"
| 8 || May 1 || @ Reds || 3–1 || Lucas (1–0) || Hallahan || — || 4,846 || 6–2
|- bgcolor="ccffcc"
| 9 || May 2 || @ Reds || 7–2 || Bowman (2–0) || Grissom || — || 17,488 || 7–2
|- bgcolor="ccffcc"
| 10 || May 4 || @ Dodgers || 10–3 || Brandt (2–0) || Henshaw || Swift (1) || 6,255 || 8–2
|- bgcolor="ccffcc"
| 11 || May 5 || @ Dodgers || 5–1 || Blanton (2–1) || Frankhouse || — || 4,362 || 9–2
|- bgcolor="ffbbbb"
| 12 || May 6 || @ Dodgers || 5–9 || Mungo || Lucas (1–1) || — || 5,847 || 9–3
|- bgcolor="ccffcc"
| 13 || May 7 || @ Phillies || 8–3 || Bowman (3–0) || LaMaster || — || 4,000 || 10–3
|- bgcolor="ccffcc"
| 14 || May 9 || @ Bees || 6–3 || Brandt (3–0) || Weir || — || 17,102 || 11–3
|- bgcolor="ccffcc"
| 15 || May 10 || @ Bees || 4–1 || Swift (2–0) || Fette || — || 1,846 || 12–3
|- bgcolor="ccffcc"
| 16 || May 11 || @ Bees || 3–0 || Blanton (3–1) || MacFayden || — || 2,316 || 13–3
|- bgcolor="ccffcc"
| 17 || May 12 || @ Giants || 6–5 || Bowman (4–0) || Smith || Swift (2) || 12,018 || 14–3
|- bgcolor="ffbbbb"
| 18 || May 13 || @ Giants || 2–5 || Hubbell || Hoyt (1–1) || — || 8,672 || 14–4
|- bgcolor="ccffcc"
| 19 || May 14 || Cardinals || 14–4 || Brown (1–0) || Dean || — || 10,000 || 15–4
|- bgcolor="ffbbbb"
| 20 || May 15 || Cardinals || 2–4 || Harrell || Swift (2–1) || Dean || 13,000 || 15–5
|- bgcolor="ccffcc"
| 21 || May 16 || Cardinals || 2–1 || Bowman (5–0) || Weiland || — || 39,571 || 16–5
|- bgcolor="ccffcc"
| 22 || May 18 || Phillies || 2–1 || Blanton (4–1) || Mulcahy || — || 2,500 || 17–5
|- bgcolor="ffbbbb"
| 23 || May 19 || Phillies || 4–5 || Walters || Brandt (3–1) || — || 2,000 || 17–6
|- bgcolor="ccffcc"
| 24 || May 20 || Phillies || 5–2 || Swift (3–1) || LaMaster || — || 2,800 || 18–6
|- bgcolor="ffbbbb"
| 25 || May 21 || Bees || 3–6 || MacFayden || Bowman (5–1) || — || 3,000 || 18–7
|- bgcolor="ccffcc"
| 26 || May 22 || Bees || 5–2 || Lucas (2–1) || Bush || Swift (3) || 7,000 || 19–7
|- bgcolor="ffbbbb"
| 27 || May 23 || Giants || 5–6 || Schumacher || Hoyt (1–2) || Melton || 29,486 || 19–8
|- bgcolor="ffbbbb"
| 28 || May 24 || Giants || 3–4 || Hubbell || Brandt (3–2) || Coffman || 17,000 || 19–9
|- bgcolor="ffbbbb"
| 29 || May 25 || Dodgers || 1–2 || Mungo || Swift (3–2) || — || 2,880 || 19–10
|- bgcolor="ccffcc"
| 30 || May 28 || @ Cardinals || 10–3 || Lucas (3–1) || Harrell || Hoyt (1) || 3,080 || 20–10
|- bgcolor="ccffcc"
| 31 || May 29 || @ Cardinals || 9–4 || Blanton (5–1) || Dean || — || — || 21–10
|- bgcolor="ffbbbb"
| 32 || May 29 || @ Cardinals || 1–2 || Weiland || Brandt (3–3) || — || 15,505 || 21–11
|- bgcolor="ccffcc"
| 33 || May 30 || @ Cardinals || 7–4 || Swift (4–2) || Harrell || — || 12,495 || 22–11
|- bgcolor="ffbbbb"
| 34 || May 31 || @ Reds || 3–8 || Davis || Bowman (5–2) || Grissom || — || 22–12
|- bgcolor="ccffcc"
| 35 || May 31 || @ Reds || 7–5 || Tobin (1–0) || Moore || Hoyt (2) || 14,352 || 23–12
|-

|- bgcolor="ccffcc"
| 36 || June 2 || @ Bees || 2–0 || Blanton (6–1) || Hutchinson || — || 2,636 || 24–12
|- bgcolor="ffbbbb"
| 37 || June 3 || @ Bees || 0–6 || Fette || Brandt (3–4) || — || 2,139 || 24–13
|- bgcolor="ffbbbb"
| 38 || June 4 || @ Bees || 1–9 || Turner || Swift (4–3) || — || 3,294 || 24–14
|- bgcolor="ffbbbb"
| 39 || June 5 || @ Giants || 5–7 || Smith || Bowman (5–3) || Melton || 15,333 || 24–15
|- bgcolor="ffbbbb"
| 40 || June 6 || @ Giants || 5–9 || Schumacher || Blanton (6–2) || Hubbell || 24,162 || 24–16
|- bgcolor="ffbbbb"
| 41 || June 7 || @ Giants || 2–5 || Gumbert || Brandt (3–5) || — || 5,446 || 24–17
|- bgcolor="ccffcc"
| 42 || June 8 || @ Phillies || 8–1 || Bauers (1–1) || LaMaster || — || 2,000 || 25–17
|- bgcolor="ffbbbb"
| 43 || June 9 || @ Phillies || 1–8 || Passeau || Tobin (1–1) || — || 1,500 || 25–18
|- bgcolor="ffbbbb"
| 44 || June 10 || @ Phillies || 4–5 || Walters || Swift (4–4) || — || 6,000 || 25–19
|- bgcolor="ccffcc"
| 45 || June 12 || @ Dodgers || 8–3 || Blanton (7–2) || Henshaw || — || 8,137 || 26–19
|- bgcolor="ffbbbb"
| 46 || June 13 || @ Dodgers || 2–6 || Mungo || Bauers (1–2) || — || — || 26–20
|- bgcolor="ffbbbb"
| 47 || June 13 || @ Dodgers || 1–4 || Fitzsimmons || Swift (4–5) || — || 30,109 || 26–21
|- bgcolor="ccffcc"
| 48 || June 15 || Giants || 7–5 || Lucas (4–1) || Hubbell || — || 8,093 || 27–21
|- bgcolor="ffbbbb"
| 49 || June 16 || Giants || 4–5 || Schumacher || Blanton (7–3) || — || 6,500 || 27–22
|- bgcolor="ccffcc"
| 50 || June 18 || Dodgers || 6–4 || Brown (2–0) || Mungo || — || 2,500 || 28–22
|- bgcolor="ffbbbb"
| 51 || June 19 || Dodgers || 3–4 || Fitzsimmons || Weaver (0–1) || — || 4,211 || 28–23
|- bgcolor="ccffcc"
| 52 || June 20 || Dodgers || 4–2 || Bowman (6–3) || Hamlin || — || — || 29–23
|- bgcolor="ffbbbb"
| 53 || June 20 || Dodgers || 2–4 || Frankhouse || Lucas (4–2) || Mungo || 23,222 || 29–24
|- bgcolor="ccffcc"
| 54 || June 22 || Bees || 4–1 || Blanton (8–3) || Turner || — || 2,500 || 30–24
|- bgcolor="ccffcc"
| 55 || June 23 || Bees || 8–5 || Bauers (2–2) || MacFayden || — || 2,331 || 31–24
|- bgcolor="ffbbbb"
| 56 || June 24 || Bees || 6–9 || Fette || Swift (4–6) || — || 5,373 || 31–25
|- bgcolor="ffbbbb"
| 57 || June 25 || Phillies || 5–10 || LaMaster || Bowman (6–4) || Jorgens || 5,183 || 31–26
|- bgcolor="ffbbbb"
| 58 || June 26 || Phillies || 6–7 (13) || Walters || Blanton (8–4) || — || 3,054 || 31–27
|- bgcolor="ccffcc"
| 59 || June 27 || Phillies || 4–3 || Lucas (5–2) || Passeau || — || 3,541 || 32–27
|- bgcolor="ccffcc"
| 60 || June 29 || @ Reds || 2–1 || Bowman (7–4) || Derringer || — || — || 33–27
|- bgcolor="ccffcc"
| 61 || June 29 || @ Reds || 13–6 || Bauers (3–2) || Vander Meer || — || 3,955 || 34–27
|- bgcolor="ccffcc"
| 62 || June 30 || @ Reds || 6–0 || Blanton (9–4) || Grissom || — || 15,568 || 35–27
|-

|- bgcolor="ffbbbb"
| 63 || July 2 || @ Cubs || 7–8 || Davis || Lucas (5–3) || — || 23,998 || 35–28
|- bgcolor="ffbbbb"
| 64 || July 3 || @ Cubs || 5–10 || Carleton || Bowman (7–5) || — || 11,665 || 35–29
|- bgcolor="ffbbbb"
| 65 || July 4 || @ Cubs || 5–8 || Root || Blanton (9–5) || — || — || 35–30
|- bgcolor="ccffcc"
| 66 || July 4 || @ Cubs || 7–6 || Swift (5–6) || Parmelee || Bowman (1) || 36,744 || 36–30
|- bgcolor="ccffcc"
| 67 || July 5 || Reds || 3–1 || Weaver (1–1) || Schott || — || — || 37–30
|- bgcolor="ccffcc"
| 68 || July 5 || Reds || 5–1 || Brandt (4–5) || Derringer || Brown (1) || 21,999 || 38–30
|- bgcolor="ccffcc"
| 69 || July 9 || Cubs || 13–1 || Bowman (8–5) || Carleton || — || 7,416 || 39–30
|- bgcolor="ffbbbb"
| 70 || July 10 || Cubs || 0–2 || French || Blanton (9–6) || — || 8,000 || 39–31
|- bgcolor="ccffcc"
| 71 || July 11 || Cubs || 3–2 || Swift (6–6) || Lee || — || 14,705 || 40–31
|- bgcolor="ffbbbb"
| 72 || July 12 || Cardinals || 5–6 || Johnson || Bauers (3–3) || — || 6,250 || 40–32
|- bgcolor="ffbbbb"
| 73 || July 14 || @ Giants || 2–4 || Hubbell || Bowman (8–6) || — || 6,995 || 40–33
|- bgcolor="ccffcc"
| 74 || July 16 || @ Giants || 4–3 (11) || Brown (3–0) || Melton || — || 7,178 || 41–33
|- bgcolor="ffbbbb"
| 75 || July 17 || @ Phillies || 8–9 || Mulcahy || Brown (3–1) || — || 3,000 || 41–34
|- bgcolor="ffbbbb"
| 76 || July 18 || @ Phillies || 2–5 || Passeau || Lucas (5–4) || — || — || 41–35
|- bgcolor="ccffcc"
| 77 || July 18 || @ Phillies || 6–5 (11) || Swift (7–6) || Mulcahy || — || 8,000 || 42–35
|- bgcolor="ccffcc"
| 78 || July 19 || @ Phillies || 6–5 || Weaver (2–1) || Walters || Brandt (1) || 1,500 || 43–35
|- bgcolor="ffbbbb"
| 79 || July 20 || @ Dodgers || 1–2 (10) || Butcher || Blanton (9–7) || — || 1,926 || 43–36
|- bgcolor="ffbbbb"
| 80 || July 21 || @ Dodgers || 0–6 || Jeffcoat || Bowman (8–7) || — || 2,283 || 43–37
|- bgcolor="ccffcc"
| 81 || July 22 || @ Dodgers || 10–1 || Lucas (6–4) || Henshaw || — || 2,551 || 44–37
|- bgcolor="ffbbbb"
| 82 || July 24 || @ Bees || 0–9 || Turner || Swift (7–7) || — || 5,236 || 44–38
|- bgcolor="ffbbbb"
| 83 || July 25 || @ Bees || 2–5 || Bush || Blanton (9–8) || — || — || 44–39
|- bgcolor="ffbbbb"
| 84 || July 25 || @ Bees || 5–7 || Fette || Bowman (8–8) || Gabler || 23,320 || 44–40
|- bgcolor="ccffcc"
| 85 || July 27 || Phillies || 4–1 || Lucas (7–4) || Walters || — || 3,807 || 45–40
|- bgcolor="ccffcc"
| 86 || July 28 || Phillies || 6–4 || Weaver (3–1) || Passeau || Brown (2) || 1,685 || 46–40
|- bgcolor="ffbbbb"
| 87 || July 29 || Phillies || 7–11 || Jorgens || Swift (7–8) || Johnson || 4,307	 || 46–41
|- bgcolor="ccffcc"
| 88 || July 30 || Bees || 1–0 || Brandt (5–5) || Bush || — || 4,126 || 47–41
|- bgcolor="ffbbbb"
| 89 || July 31 || Bees || 7–9 || Hutchinson || Swift (7–9) || Smith || 4,116 || 47–42
|-

|- bgcolor="ccffcc"
| 90 || August 1 || Bees || 8–4 || Bauers (4–3) || MacFayden || — || 6,214 || 48–42
|- bgcolor="ccffcc"
| 91 || August 3 || Dodgers || 5–4 || Weaver (4–1) || Frankhouse || — || — || 49–42
|- bgcolor="ccffcc"
| 92 || August 3 || Dodgers || 10–4 || Brown (4–1) || Butcher || Bauers (1) || 6,588 || 50–42
|- bgcolor="ffbbbb"
| 93 || August 4 || Dodgers || 7–10 || Fitzsimmons || Brandt (5–6) || Lindsey || 1,594 || 50–43
|- bgcolor="ffbbbb"
| 94 || August 5 || Dodgers || 6–9 || Hoyt || Blanton (9–9) || — || 3,693 || 50–44
|- bgcolor="ffbbbb"
| 95 || August 6 || Giants || 3–6 || Hubbell || Lucas (7–5) || — || 6,444 || 50–45
|- bgcolor="ffbbbb"
| 96 || August 8 || Giants || 2–10 || Melton || Brown (4–2) || — || — || 50–46
|- bgcolor="ccffcc"
| 97 || August 8 || Giants || 3–0 || Weaver (5–1) || Gumbert || — || 34,000 || 51–46
|- bgcolor="ccffcc"
| 98 || August 10 || @ Cubs || 6–5 || Blanton (10–9) || Shoun || Brown (3) || 12,516 || 52–46
|- bgcolor="ffbbbb"
| 99 || August 11 || @ Cubs || 1–5 || Bryant || Lucas (7–6) || — || 11,363 || 52–47
|- bgcolor="ccffcc"
| 100 || August 12 || @ Cubs || 16–6 || Bauers (5–3) || Carleton || — || 10,977 || 53–47
|- bgcolor="ffbbbb"
| 101 || August 13 || @ Cardinals || 1–4 || Weiland || Weaver (5–2) || — || 3,752 || 53–48
|- bgcolor="ccffcc"
| 102 || August 14 || @ Cardinals || 6–5 || Weaver (6–2) || Ryba || Tobin (1) || 4,998 || 54–48
|- bgcolor="ccffcc"
| 103 || August 15 || @ Cardinals || 8–4 || Blanton (11–9) || Warneke || — || — || 55–48
|- bgcolor="ccffcc"
| 104 || August 15 || @ Cardinals || 4–0 || Bauers (6–3) || Johnson || — || 23,083 || 56–48
|- bgcolor="ccffcc"
| 105 || August 17 || Cubs || 4–2 || Brandt (6–6) || French || Brown (4) || 6,593 || 57–48
|- bgcolor="ccffcc"
| 106 || August 18 || Cubs || 7–6 || Bauers (7–3) || Shoun || — || 5,581 || 58–48
|- bgcolor="ffbbbb"
| 107 || August 19 || Cubs || 3–7 || Davis || Weaver (6–3) || — || 6,576 || 58–49
|- bgcolor="ccffcc"
| 108 || August 20 || Cardinals || 7–4 || Blanton (12–9) || Johnson || — || 6,060 || 59–49
|- bgcolor="ccffcc"
| 109 || August 21 || Cardinals || 7–3 || Bauers (8–3) || Harrell || — || 5,714 || 60–49
|- bgcolor="ffbbbb"
| 110 || August 22 || Cardinals || 0–12 || Weiland || Lucas (7–7) || — || — || 60–50
|- bgcolor="ffbbbb"
| 111 || August 22 || Cardinals || 7–9 || Dean || Brandt (6–7) || — || 36,673 || 60–51
|- bgcolor="ffbbbb"
| 112 || August 24 || @ Bees || 0–1 || Turner || Blanton (12–10) || — || 2,162 || 60–52
|- bgcolor="ccffcc"
| 113 || August 25 || @ Bees || 6–0 || Bauers (9–3) || Gabler || — || 3,507 || 61–52
|- bgcolor="ccffcc"
| 114 || August 27 || @ Giants || 1–0 || Brandt (7–7) || Melton || Brown (5) || — || 62–52
|- bgcolor="ffbbbb"
| 115 || August 27 || @ Giants || 2–3 || Smith || Swift (7–10) || — || 13,004 || 62–53
|- bgcolor="ffbbbb"
| 116 || August 28 || @ Giants || 4–9 || Coffman || Weaver (6–4) || — || — || 62–54
|- bgcolor="ffbbbb"
| 117 || August 28 || @ Giants || 1–3 || Schumacher || Bauers (9–4) || — || 42,438 || 62–55
|- bgcolor="ffbbbb"
| 118 || August 29 || @ Dodgers || 3–5 || Hoyt || Lucas (7–8) || — || — || 62–56
|- bgcolor="ffbbbb"
| 119 || August 29 || @ Dodgers || 3–6 || Hamlin || Tobin (1–2) || — || 12,000 || 62–57
|- bgcolor="ffbbbb"
| 120 || August 31 || @ Phillies || 0–3 || Walters || Brandt (7–8) || — || 2,500 || 62–58
|-

|- bgcolor="ffbbbb"
| 121 || September 1 || @ Phillies || 3–5 || Passeau || Weaver (6–5) || — || 3,000 || 62–59
|- bgcolor="ccffcc"
| 122 || September 2 || @ Phillies || 11–8 || Brown (5–2) || LaMaster || Brandt (2) || 3,000 || 63–59
|- bgcolor="ccffcc"
| 123 || September 5 || @ Cubs || 7–0 || Lucas (8–8) || French || — || — || 64–59
|- bgcolor="ccffcc"
| 124 || September 5 || @ Cubs || 4–1 || Brandt (8–8) || Bryant || Brown (6) || 34,091 || 65–59
|- bgcolor="ffbbbb"
| 125 || September 6 || @ Cardinals || 1–4 || Weiland || Blanton (12–11) || — || — || 65–60
|- bgcolor="ccffcc"
| 126 || September 6 || @ Cardinals || 5–4 || Bauers (10–4) || Johnson || — || 16,746 || 66–60
|- bgcolor="ccffcc"
| 127 || September 8 || Reds || 7–6 (10) || Weaver (7–5) || Derringer || — || — || 67–60
|- bgcolor="ccffcc"
| 128 || September 8 || Reds || 8–2 || Tobin (2–2) || Mooty || — || 3,508 || 68–60
|- bgcolor="ccffcc"
| 129 || September 9 || Reds || 1–0 || Brandt (9–8) || Schott || — || 1,986 || 69–60
|- bgcolor="ccffcc"
| 130 || September 10 || Reds || 7–6 || Brown (6–2) || Hallahan || — || 1,169 || 70–60
|- bgcolor="ffbbbb"
| 131 || September 11 || Cubs || 4–5 || Davis || Bauers (10–5) || — || 3,100 || 70–61
|- bgcolor="ffbbbb"
| 132 || September 12 || Cubs || 0–5 || French || Lucas (8–9) || — || — || 70–62
|- bgcolor="ccffcc"
| 133 || September 12 || Cubs || 4–2 || Tobin (3–2) || Lee || — || 25,000 || 71–62
|- bgcolor="ffbbbb"
| 134 || September 14 || Giants || 2–12 || Hubbell || Brandt (9–9) || — || — || 71–63
|- bgcolor="ccffcc"
| 135 || September 14 || Giants || 6–2 || Blanton (13–11) || Smith || — || 10,000 || 72–63
|- bgcolor="ffbbbb"
| 136 || September 15 || Giants || 2–7 || Schumacher || Bauers (10–6) || — || 1,621 || 72–64
|- bgcolor="ffbbbb"
| 137 || September 16 || Giants || 0–3 || Melton || Tobin (3–3) || — || 3,750 || 72–65
|- bgcolor="ccffcc"
| 138 || September 17 || Dodgers || 10–4 || Brandt (10–9) || Hamlin || — || 927 || 73–65
|- bgcolor="ccffcc"
| 139 || September 18 || Dodgers || 3–2 || Blanton (14–11) || Fitzsimmons || — || 1,598 || 74–65
|- bgcolor="ffbbbb"
| 140 || September 19 || Phillies || 1–8 || Mulcahy || Lucas (8–10) || — || — || 74–66
|- bgcolor="ccffcc"
| 141 || September 19 || Phillies || 5–1 || Bauers (11–6) || Kelleher || — || 6,137 || 75–66
|- bgcolor="ccffcc"
| 142 || September 21 || Bees || 9–2 || Tobin (4–3) || Fette || — || 1,066 || 76–66
|- bgcolor="ffbbbb"
| 143 || September 22 || Bees || 2–3 (10) || Shoffner || Brandt (10–10) || — || 1,103 || 76–67
|- bgcolor="ffbbbb"
| 144 || September 23 || Bees || 1–2 || Turner || Blanton (14–12) || — || 1,031 || 76–68
|- bgcolor="ccffcc"
| 145 || September 24 || @ Reds || 8–2 || Bauers (12–6) || Schott || — || 301 || 77–68
|- bgcolor="ccffcc"
| 146 || September 26 || @ Reds || 5–4 || Tobin (5–3) || Schott || — || — || 78–68
|- bgcolor="ccffcc"
| 147 || September 26 || @ Reds || 2–1 || Swift (8–10) || Grissom || — || 3,058 || 79–68
|- bgcolor="ccffcc"
| 148 || September 28 || Cardinals || 6–2 || Brandt (11–10) || Johnson || — || 1,068 || 80–68
|- bgcolor="ccffcc"
| 149 || September 29 || Cardinals || 7–5 || Weaver (8–5) || Warneke || Brown (7) || 1,226 || 81–68
|- bgcolor="ccffcc"
| 150 || September 30 || Cardinals || 4–3 || Bauers (13–6) || Weiland || — || 1,477 || 82–68
|-

|- bgcolor="ccffcc"
| 151 || October 1 || Reds || 6–3 || Tobin (6–3) || Hollingsworth || — || 852 || 83–68
|- bgcolor="ccffcc"
| 152 || October 2 || Reds || 4–3 (11) || Swift (9–10) || Vander Meer || — || 1,020 || 84–68
|- bgcolor="ccffcc"
| 153 || October 3 || Reds || 4–3 || Heintzelman (1–0) || Kleinhans || — || — || 85–68
|- bgcolor="ccffcc"
| 154 || October 3 || Reds || 4–0 (7) || Brown (7–2) || Davis || — || 2,064 || 86–68
|-

|-
| Legend:       = Win       = LossBold = Pirates team member

Opening Day lineup

Roster

Player stats

Batting

Starters by position
Note: Pos = Position; G = Games played; AB = At bats; H = Hits; Avg. = Batting average; HR = Home runs; RBI = Runs batted in

Other batters
Note: G = Games played; AB = At bats; H = Hits; Avg. = Batting average; HR = Home runs; RBI = Runs batted in

Pitching

Starting pitchers 
Note: G = Games pitched; IP = Innings pitched; W = Wins; L = Losses; ERA = Earned run average; SO = Strikeouts

Other pitchers
Note: G = Games pitched; IP = Innings pitched; W = Wins; L = Losses; ERA = Earned run average; SO = Strikeouts

Relief pitchers
Note: G = Games pitched; W = Wins; L = Losses; SV = Saves; ERA = Earned run average; SO = Strikeouts

Farm system

LEAGUE CHAMPIONS: Savannah

References

External links
 1937 Pittsburgh Pirates team page at Baseball Reference
 1937 Pittsburgh Pirates Page at Baseball Almanac
 Pittsburgh Post-Gazette cartoon on the pennant race

Pittsburgh Pirates seasons
Pittsburgh Pirates season
Pittsburg Pir